Govinda Kalita was an Indian politician and Leader of Communist Party of India. He represented Gauhati West constituency in the Assam Legislative Assembly from 1967 to 1972.

References

Communist Party of India politicians from Assam
Assam MLAs 1967–1972